Hunter High School  is a high school in West Valley City, Utah, United States.

Hunter High School may also refer to:

 Hunter High School, East Kilbride, Scotland
 Hunter College High School, New York City

See also
 Clifton Hunter High School, Cayman Islands
 Manhattan/Hunter College High School for Sciences, New York City